The Strange Mrs. Crane is a 1948 American film noir directed by Sam Newfield (credited as Sherman Scott) for Eagle-Lion Films.

Plot 
The Al Martin–penned murder drama centers around a gubernatorial candidate's wife's ex-partner's fiancée who is wrongly tried for murder. It turns out that the real culprit is the lady jury foreman who makes a fatal error at the last split second of the movie.

Production 
Filming on The Strange Mrs. Crane began on June 11, 1948, at the Morey-Sutherland Studios. The script was adapted from 'Beyond a Reasonable Doubt', an episode of The Whistler, a radio program, and the episode aired on July 16, 1947.

Cast 

 Gina Crane (Marjorie Lord)
 Floyd Durant (Robert Shayne)
 Clinton Crane (Pierre Watkin)
 Mark Emery (James Seay)
 Barbara Arnold (Ruth Brady, 1920–1997)
 Edna Emmerson (Claire Whitney)
 Jeanette Woods (Dorothy Granger)

References 

Film noir
1948 films
American crime films
1948 crime films
1940s English-language films
Films directed by Sam Newfield
Eagle-Lion Films films
American black-and-white films
1940s American films